The Gift is the 13th album and a DVD movie by rapper, Andre Nickatina and directed by Shane Mario Ruggieri.  It was released on January 25, 2005, for Fillmoe Coleman Records and featured production from Andre Nickatina, Smoov-E, Tone Capone, Dion Peete, Krushadelic, DJ Pause and the A-T.E.A.M.

Track listing
"What's Up with U"- 4:26
"King City"- 2:51
"STR-8 Pimpin'"- 5:04
"I'm a Junkie"- 2:51
"Suits-n-Boots"- 3:23
"Leopard"- 3:59
"V.I.P. List"- 3:46
"The Gift"- 2:24
"Bonus"- 4:06
"Cupcakes-n-Cookies"- 3:49
"Lost Hawks"- 3:33

2005 albums
Andre Nickatina albums